During the 2008–09 English football season, Cheltenham Town F.C. competed in Football League One.

Season summary
A 4–1 defeat at Hartlepool United saw manager Keith Downing depart by mutual consent in September. His replacement was Martin Allen, the son of former Robins manager Dennis. Allen was unable to improve results enough for Cheltenham to escape the drop.

Kit
Italian company Erreà continued as Cheltenham's kit manufacturers, while Cheltenham-based plumbing company Mira Showers began sponsoring the kits. For the first time in 15 years, Cheltenham wore kits with no stripes, with Erreà instead opting for a plain red design with asymmetric white trim. The away kit was yellow with red piping.

First-team squad
Squad at end of season

Left club during season

References

Cheltenham Town
Cheltenham Town F.C. seasons